The 1952 National League Division One was the 18th season of speedway in the United Kingdom and the seventh post-war season of the highest tier of motorcycle speedway in Great Britain.

Summary
Norwich Stars joined the league. Wembley Lions won their fourth consecutive title and their seventh overall. Birmingham recorded their highest league finish to date by taking the runner-up spot.

While riding for Wimbledon, on 22 July 1952 the American Ernie Roccio was killed after crashing into the fence at high speed at West Ham Stadium, it has been reported that he died instantly but the newspaper report states he died in hospital.

Final table

Top Ten Riders (League only)

National Trophy Stage Three
The 1952 National Trophy was the 15th edition of the Knockout Cup. The Trophy consisted of three stages; stage one was for the third tier clubs, stage two was for the second tier clubs and stage three was for the top tier clubs. The winner of stage one would qualify for stage two and the winner of stage two would qualify for the third and final stage. Harringay won the third and final stage and were therefore declared the 1952 National Trophy champions.

 For Stage One - see Stage One
 For Stage Two - see Stage Two

First round

Second round

Semifinals

Final

First leg

Second leg

Harringay were National Trophy Champions, winning on aggregate 123–92.

See also
 List of United Kingdom Speedway League Champions
 Knockout Cup (speedway)

References

Speedway National League
1952 in speedway
1952 in British motorsport